Miami-Dade Transit (MDT) is the primary public transit authority of Miami, Florida and the greater Miami-Dade County area. It is the largest transit system in Florida and the 15th-largest transit system in the United States. MDT operates the Metrobus with their paratransit STS systems run by LSF. MDT also operates two rail transit systems: Metrorail and Metromover.

Metrobus operates over 93 routes, including the South-Dade Transitway. MDT's main transit stations are Government Center in Downtown, and the Miami Intermodal Center in Grapeland Heights, which can access the Miami International Airport.

Metrorail is composed of two rail lines (Green and Orange lines) with 23 stations radiating from the city center towards outlying neighborhoods north and south of Downtown. Metromover operates throughout the Downtown, Omni, and Brickell neighborhoods, and is composed of three rail loops and 22 stations. The opening of the Metrorail Orange Line in July 2012 significantly increased usage of the system.  As of 2013, rail fares collected were $23 million/yr and it cost $78 million/yr to operate the rail system.

Tri-Rail is a separate entity and not controlled by MDT. Tri-Rail, a commuter rail system, connects the Miami Intermodal Center & Tri-Rail Metrorail Transfer station to Fort Lauderdale and West Palm Beach.

History 
In 1960, the Dade County Commission passed an ordinance creating the Metropolitan Transit Authority (MTA) to unify the different transit operations into one countywide service. This ordinance provided for the purchase, development, and operation of an adequate mass transit system by the County. These companies included the Miami Transit Company, Miami Beach Railway Company, South Miami Coach Lines, and Keys Transit Company on Key Biscayne and would be managed by National City Management Company. National City was dismissed as manager in 1974. Over the years and under various administrations, MTA evolved into the Metro-Dade Transportation Administration, the Metro-Dade Transit Agency, the Miami-Dade Transit Agency, and is now known simply as Miami-Dade Transit (MDT).

Miami-Dade Transit, a county department of more than 4,000 employees, is the largest transit agency in the state of Florida and accounts for more than half of the trips taken on public transit in the state. MDT operates an accessible, integrated system of 93-plus Metrobus routes; the  Metrorail rapid transit system; Metromover, a free Downtown people mover system; and the Paratransit division's Special Transportation Service. Metrobus routes cover more than 35-million miles annually, including limited service to Broward and Monroe counties. In 2004, MDT's Metrorail, Metromover, and Metrobus transported more than 96 million passengers, compared to 85 million the previous year.

2011 federal investigation 
Miami-Dade Transit was undergoing a federal investigation by the Federal Transit Administration that includes several audits and a criminal investigation of the transit agency due to concerns over money mismanagement within the agency. This caused a freezing of federal funds being granted to the county agency. In late 2010 the county manager claimed that it was 'not fraud' but rather accounting errors, poor management, and erroneous information given to the auditors that triggered the investigation, including a withdrawal of $15 million through the ECHO program that was made by a transit official two hours after a letter arrived in September 2010 from the FTA telling them withdrawals had been restricted. The investigation and lack of funding let to emergency service cuts to Metrorail, Metrobus, and Metromover being considered by the agency by the middle of 2011, six months into the investigation and lack of funding which began in November 2010, causing MDT to lose $185 million in grant money. Assistant county manager Ysela Llort became responsible for Miami-Dade Transit after director Harpal Kapoor left in April 2011. Additionally, funding for the Metrorail airport link was jeopardized by the funding freeze. The FTA decided to continue funding under strict control in order to keep service cuts from happening.

MDT headquarters are located in the Overtown Transit Village in Downtown Miami.

Future

The SMART Program 
The Strategic Miami Area Rapid Transit (SMART) Program involves the implementation of five rapid transit corridors in Miami-Dade County. It includes new extensions of the current Metrorail and Metromover systems as well as the introduction of new forms of rapid transit, such as bus rapid transit (BRT).

South Dade TransitWay (South Corridor) 
The South-Dade Transitway Corridor will become a gold standard BRT, including 2 terminals and 14 new iconic BRT stations, all featuring fare gates, center platform boarding, all-door and level boarding, next bus arrival screens, air-conditioned waiting areas, and other rail-like amenities. Along the transitway, signal preemption and level crossing gates will be implemented so that BRT vehicles never stop at a light. The vehicles used will be 60-foot battery-electric articulated buses. The project should be completed by 2024.

North Corridor 
The North Corridor is an extension of the current Metrorail system along NW 27 Avenue from the Dr. Martin Luther King Jr. Plaza station to the north county line. It will be implemented in two phases. The first phase will extend the Metrorail to a station at the Hard Rock Stadium, with a stop at the Miami-Dade College North Campus. The second phase will include the remainder of the project, with a total of eight new stations added.

Northeast Corridor 
The Northeast Corridor will feature commuter rail service (potentially Tri-Rail), extending from MiamiCentral to the Aventura station along the existing Florida East Coast Railway (FEC) tracks. It will have seven stations for the service in Miami-Dade, with both of the terminal stations having access to Brightline.

East-West Corridor 
The East-West Corridor consists of three BRT routes on dedicated bus lanes running from Tamiami Terminal to the Miami Intermodal Center and Government Center, as well as through the Blue Lagoon area. One of the routes will go on dedicated lanes, mainly along SR 836, and include four stations between Tamiami Terminal and the Miami Intermodal Center.

Beach Corridor 
The Beach Corridor includes three rapid transit projects. The first is an extension of the current Metromover system along Miami Avenue from the School Board station to NW 41st Street. The second, known as Baylink, is another Metromover extension along the southern edge of MacArthur Causeway to Miami Beach, with stations in between. Baylink could begin service as soon as 2028. The third is dedicated bus/trolley lanes along Washington Avenue from 5th Street to the Miami Beach Convention Center.

Metrorail 

Metrorail is an elevated heavy rail rapid transit system.

Metrorail serves the urban core of Miami, connecting the urban centers of Miami International Airport, the Health District, Downtown Miami, and Brickell with the northern developed neighborhoods of Hialeah and Medley to the northwest, and to suburban The Roads, Coconut Grove, Coral Gables, and South Miami, ending at Dadeland South in Kendall.

Metromover 

Metromover is a free, elevated, automated mass transit people mover that runs on three loops: the Downtown Inner Loop, Brickell Loop, and the Omni Loop. The systems total  with 22 stations at roughly every two blocks in the greater Downtown area. Metromover serves the neighborhoods of Downtown, Arts & Entertainment District, Brickell, Park West, and Overtown.

Metrobus 

The Metrobus network provides bus service throughout Miami-Dade County 365 days a year.  It consists of about 93 routes and 880 buses, which connect most points in the county and part of southern Broward County as well.  Seven of these routes operate around the clock: Routes 3, 11, 27, 38, 77 (last bus from Downtown Miami 1:10am, first bus from Downtown Miami 4:10am), L (No 24-hour service to Hialeah, all trips terminate at Northside Station) and S. Routes 246 Night Owl (served by LSF) & Route 500 Midnight Owl (County operated) which operate from midnight to 5am. Most other routes operate from 4:30am to 1:30am. All Metrobuses are wheelchair accessible, in compliance with the Americans with Disabilities Act of 1990, and all county buses except for private run routes are equipped with bicycle racks. Some privatized routes trucks are receiving bike racks but very limited.

Bus route 301 (Dade-Monroe Express) extends into Monroe County, reaching Marathon, where a transfer is available to a Key West Transit bus proceeding further into the Keys.  With the appropriate bus transfers, one can travel all the way from Key West to Jupiter entirely on public-transit buses.

Paratransit (STS) 

Paratransit/Special Transportation Services (STS) is available for people with a mental or physical disability who cannot ride Metrobus, Metrorail, or Metromover. For $3.50 per one-way trip, STS offers shared-ride, door-to-door travel in accessible vehicles throughout most of Miami-Dade County, in some parts of south Broward County, and in the middle and northern Keys. STS operates 24 hours a day, 7 days a week, including most holidays. Service is run by private company.

Rates 

The "EASY Card" system is a regional fare collection system with interoperable smartcards and equipment.  The following information is specific to Miami-Dade Transit:

Since October 1, 2009, Miami-Dade Transit has used the EASY Card system for fare collection.

On December 13, 2009 paper-based bus transfers were discontinued, and bus-to-bus transfers are now free only when using an EASY Card or EASY Ticket.

 An EASY Card can be purchased for $2 at EASY Card sales outlets, vending machines in Metrorail stations, calling 3-1-1 in Miami-Dade County, or online. Money can be reloaded on to the card at the same places and locations. The card is durable plastic and lasts for 20 years from first use since 2013.
 Alternatively an EASY Ticket may be purchased with no sales charge.  However EASY Tickets are limited to the fare type initially loaded onto it, and expire 60 days after purchase.  EASY Tickets also may not be purchased online or via telephone.
 With the change, paper transfers are being eliminated on transit. People paying fares in cash will need to pay full fare when transferring. Transfers will be available only by paying with an EASY Card or Ticket and using the card again within 3 hours of boarding transit.

The current standard fare is $2.25 and reduced fare is $1.10. A standard monthly pass costs $112.50 and $56.25 for reduced fare (College Students). The monthly Metropass is loaded onto the EASY Card. Fare gates at all Metrorail stations does not accept any type of cash, and require an EASY Card/Ticket, contactless device, or contactless debit/credit card to enter and exit the stations.

Reduced fares are available only to Medicare recipients, people with disabilities, and Miami-Dade students in grades K-12. Full time college students may also purchase a College EASY Ticket to ride Metrobus or Metrorail at $56.25 at their college/university along with a valid Student ID. Miami-Dade County employees can also receive discounted monthly rates and pre-tax savings by enrolling in the Monthly Pass Payroll Deduction program.

All Miami-Dade senior citizens aged 65 years and older and with Social Security benefits ride free with a Golden Passport pass. Veterans residing in Miami-Dade and earning less than $22,000 annually ride free with the Patriot Passport pass.

As of August 21, 2019, and December 23, 2019 riders can use their smartphones/smartwatches and contactless credit/debt cards to board the Metrorail and Metrobus.  (Accepting Apple Pay, Google Pay, Samsung Pay, Fitbit Pay etc.).

Finances 
In 2018, the annual operating expense was $552 million; annual revenue was $106 million.  Each passenger trip cost $6.77.  One-way rides on Metrobus and Metrorails cost $2.25; rides on Metromover were free of charge to passengers.

Passenger ridership 

In February 2011, Miami-Dade Transit ridership totaled 336,067 passengers, including all Metrorail, Metromover and Metrobus lines. With a population of about 2.5 million in Miami-Dade County, Miami-Dade Transit accounts for 15% of the population's daily mode of transportation. Note: This figure does not include Tri-Rail, Miami's commuter rail operator.

Since the debut of Uber in the Miami area ridership has decreased each year, especially on the buses. By 2018, there were fewer riders than in 1999.  In 2018, Metrorail and Metromover began to shut down earlier in the evening; the peak in-service fleet was cut by 4%; and service miles were cut by 2 million.

Annual passenger ridership

* Record highs

Weekday passenger ridership averages

See also 

Transportation in South Florida
Tri-Rail
List of rapid transit systems

References

External links 

 Miami-Dade Transit
 Citizens' Independent Transportation Trust
 APTA ridership information

 
 
1960 establishments in Florida
Bus rapid transit in Florida
Bus transportation in Florida